Eremochrysa canadensis is a species of green lacewing in the family Chrysopidae. It is found in North America.

References

Further reading

 

Chrysopidae
Articles created by Qbugbot
Insects described in 1911